Khon Kaen United Football Club is a Thai professional football club based in Khon Kaen province. The club currently plays in Thai League 1.

History
The club was formed in 2015 and entered the Regional League Division 2 and allocated into the North-East Division that makes Khon Kaen Derby match with Khon Kaen.

In 2016, The club was suspended from the 2016 campaign due to criminal case with 8 games remaining.

In 2018, The club was returned to play Thailand professional league because the team is acquitted by the Thailand Court of justice decide. FA Thailand order this team to restart at 2018 Thai League 4 North Eastern Region. In the end of season the club finished with Runners-up of Thai League 4 and Promote from Thai League 4 to Thai League 3.

In 2019, Champion of Thai League 3 upper zone & Champion of Thai League 3 and Promote from Thai League 3 to Thai League 2.

Stadium and locations

Season-by-season record

Players

Current squad

Player out on loan

Club staff

Managerial history
Head coaches by years (2015–present)

 Thongchai Sukkoki 
 Dave Booth 
 Ljubomir Ristovski 
 Apichai Pholpitak 
 Sarayuth Chaikamdee 
 Patipat Robroo 
 Sugao Kambe   
 Patipat Robroo 
 Carlos Eduardo Parreira 
 Pairoj Borwonwatanadilok 
 Patipat Robroo

Honours

Domestic competitions

League
Thai League 3
  Winners : 2019
Thai League 3 Upper Region
  Winners : 2019
Thai League 4
  Runners-up : 2018
Regional League North-East Division:
  Champions (1): 2015

References

External links
 
 https://www.facebook.com/KhonkaenUTD/

Football clubs in Thailand
Association football clubs established in 2015
Khon Kaen province
2015 establishments in Thailand